Acacia maxwellii is a shrub belonging to the genus Acacia and the subgenus Phyllodineae that is endemic to south western Australia.

Description
Like most species of Acacia it has phyllodes rather than true leaves. The thick, glabrous and evergreen phyllodes are erect with a linear shape that is straight to shallowly curved. It blooms from September to October and produces yellow-cream flowers.

Distribution
It is native to an area along the south coast in the Great Southern and Goldfields-Esperance regions of Western Australia where it is commonly situated on flats, undulating plains and along watercourses growing in sandy, sandy clay, loamy or gravelly soils. The range of the plant extends from around the Stirling Range in the north west to around Israelite Bay where it is usually a part of shrub mallee and mallee heath communities.

See also
 List of Acacia species

References

maxwellii
Acacias of Western Australia
Taxa named by Joseph Maiden
Taxa named by William Blakely
Plants described in 1928